Euronext Paris is France's securities market, formerly known as the Paris Bourse, which merged with the Amsterdam, Lisbon, and Brussels exchanges in September 2000 to form Euronext NV. As of 2022, the 795 companies listed had a combined market capitalization of over US$4.5 trillion.
Euronext Paris, the French branch of Euronext, is Europe's second-largest stock exchange market, behind the London Stock Exchange. In November 2022,  it became Europe’s largest stock exchange, overtaking the London Stock Exchange, the first time since 2003. Soon after, the LSE retook its position.

History

In the early 19th century, the Paris Bourse's activities found a stable location at the Palais Brongniart, or Palais de la Bourse, built to the designs of architect Alexandre-Théodore Brongniart from 1808 to 1813 and completed by Éloi Labarre from 1813 to 1826. Brongniart had spontaneously submitted his project, which was a rectangular neoclassical Roman temple with a giant Corinthian colonnade enclosing a vaulted and arcaded central chamber. His designs were greatly admired by Napoleon and won Brongniart a major public commission at the end of his career. Initially praised, the building was later attacked for academic dullness. The authorities had required Brongniart to modify his designs, and after Brongniart's death in 1813, Labarre altered them even further, greatly weakening Brongniart's original intentions.  From 1901 to 1905 Jean-Baptiste-Frederic Cavel designed the addition of two lateral wings, resulting in a cruciform plan with innumerable columns. According to the architectural historian Andrew Ayers, these alterations "did nothing to improve the reputation of this uninspiring monument."

From the second half of the 19th century, official stock markets in Paris were operated by the Compagnie des agents de change, directed by the elected members of a stockbrokers' syndical council. The number of dealers in each of the different trading areas of the Bourse was limited. There were around 60 agents de change (the official stockbrokers). An agent de change had to be a French citizen, be
nominated by a former agent or his estate, and be approved by the Minister of Finance, and he was appointed by decree of the President of the Republic. Officially, the agents de change could not trade for their own account nor even be a counterpart to someone who wanted to buy or sell securities with their aid; they were strictly brokers, that is, intermediaries. In the financial literature, the Paris Bourse is hence referred to as order-driven market, as opposed to quote-driven markets or dealer markets, where price-setting is handled by a dealer or market-maker. In Paris, only agents de change could receive a commission, at a rate fixed by law, for acting as an intermediary. However, parallel arrangements were usual in order to favor some clients' quote. The Commodities Exchange was housed in the same building until 1889, when it moved to the present Bourse de commerce.
Moreover, until about the middle of the 20th century, a parallel market known as "La Coulisse" was in operation.

Until the late 1980s, the market operated as an open outcry exchange, with the agents de change meeting on the exchange floor of the Palais Brongniart. In 1986, the Paris Bourse started to implement an electronic trading system. This was known generically as CATS (Computer Assisted Trading System), but the Paris version was called CAC (Cotation Assistée en Continu). By 1989, quotations were fully automated. The Palais Brongniart hosted the French financial derivatives exchanges MATIF and MONEP, until they were fully automated in 1998.

In 1988, new legislation was adopted that radically reformed the governance of the Paris stock exchange. The next year, SBF was a leading participant of the merger that formed Euronext.

Buildings

Following the collapse of John Law's Mississippi Company in 1721, the Paris bourse was located in his Hôtel de Nevers from 24 September 1724 to 27 June 1793, when it suspended operations in the chaotic context of the French Revolution. It reopened on 10 May 1795 in the Louvre Palace, in Anne of Austria's former summer apartment on the ground floor of the Petite Galerie, and stayed there until 9 September 1795. In September 1795 the Bourse again closed for a few months; it reopened in January 1796 in the Church of Notre-Dame-des-Victoires, then in October 1807 moved to the Palais-Royal, and finally, in March 1818, to the former , adjacent to the site where the Palais Brongniart was already in construction. On , the stock exchange finally moved to the latter building, which was and remains owned by the City of Paris.

That building remained the seat of SBF, then Euronext Paris until the latter moved to La Défense in 2015. The building on rue Cambon was subsequently restructured to house offices of Chanel.

Operations
It operates the MATIF futures exchange, which trades futures and options on interest rate products and commodities, and MONEP, equity and index futures and options. All products are traded electronically on the NSC system adopted by all of the Euronext members. Transactions are cleared through LCH.Clearnet. Cash settlement is T+2. Trading hours are 9 am to 5:30 pm CET, Monday to Friday.

Structure and indices
The French equities market is divided into three sections. The Premier Marché, formerly called the Official List, includes large French and foreign companies, and most Bond issues. The Second Marché, lists medium-sized companies, while nouveau marché lists fast-growing start up companies seeking capital to finance expansion, linked to Euro.nm, the European equity growth market. A third market, Marché Libre, is nonregulated, administered by Euronext Paris for transactions in securities not listed on the other three markets.

Euronext Paris calculates a family of indices. The CAC 40 is the exchange's benchmark, disseminated in real time. Its components are included in the broader SBF 120 Index, a benchmark for investment funds. The SBF 250 index, a benchmark for the long-term performance of equity portfolios, includes all of the SBF 120; it is structured by sector. The MIDCAC index includes 100 of the most liquid medium-size stocks on the Premier Marché and Nouveau Marché calculated on the basis of opening and closing prices, while the Second Marché index focuses on that market.  Both indices are benchmarks for funds. The Nouveau Marché Index represents stocks in the growth market. The SBF-FCI index is based on a selection of convertible bonds that represent at least 70% of the total capitalization of this market, calculated twice daily. For derivatives, MONEP trades short-term and long-term stock options and futures and options on a family of Dow Jones indices. Euronext Commodities products include commodity future and options on European rapeseed and futures on rapeseed meal, European rapeseed oil, milling wheat, corn, wood pellets, dairy and Paris Real Estate.

Key figures

For the fiscal year ending December 2004, Euronext Paris recorded sales of US$522 million, a −12.9% decrease in sales from 2003.

Euronext Paris has a US$2.9 trillion total market capitalization of listed companies and average daily trading value of its combined markets of approximately US$102 billion/€77 billion (as of 28 February 2007).

See also
 List of French companies
 CAC 40
 CAC Next 20
 French Society of Financial Analysts

References

External links
Euronext Paris website
MONEP website

Financial services companies established in 2000
2000 establishments in France
Paris
Economy of Paris
Futures exchanges
Stock exchanges in France